Phippsburg is a census-designated place (CDP) and a post office in and governed by Routt County, Colorado, United States. The CDP is a part of the Steamboat Springs, CO Micropolitan Statistical Area.

Description
The Phippsburg post office has the ZIP Code 80469 (post office boxes). At the United States Census 2010, the population of the Phippsburg CDP was 204, while the population of the 80469 ZIP Code Tabulation Area was 337 including adjacent areas.

History
The Phippsburg post office has been in operation since 1909.  The community was named after Lawrence C. Phipps, a Colorado legislator.

Geography

Demographics

See also

 List of census-designated places in Colorado

References

External links

 Phippsburg @ Colorado.com
 Phippsburg @ UncoverColorado.com
 Routt County website

Census-designated places in Routt County, Colorado
Census-designated places in Colorado